Kinsella is a surname of Irish Gaelic origin, developed from the original form Cinnsealach, meaning "proud". The Kinsella sept is native in part of the modern County Wexford in Leinster, a district formerly called the Kinsellaghs. The oldest documentary mention of the surname appears in the Ancient Records of Leinster, dated to 1170, where the son of the King of Leinster is named as Enna Cinsealach. Originally pronounced  , it is also often found pronounced   (especially in Australia and New Zealand). This surname is most often found in Ireland, Northern Europe, Australia and New Zealand.

People with this surname

 Alice Kinsella (born 2001), British gymnast
 Arthur Kinsella, QSO (1918–2004), New Zealand politician
 Ben Kinsella (1991–2008), English murder victim
 Bob Kinsella (1899–1951), American baseball outfielder
 Brian Kinsella (born 1954), Canadian ice hockey player
 Brooke Kinsella (born 1983), English actress
 Douglas Kinsella (1932–2004), Canadian medical ethics expert
 Eamonn Kinsella (1932–1991), Irish Olympic athlete
 Edward Kinsella (disambiguation), several people
 Elaine Kinsella, Irish radio presenter and writer
 James Kinsella (disambiguation), several people
 John Kinsella (disambiguation), several people
 Kevin Kinsella, American reggae and roots rock musician
 Lauren Kinsella (born 1983), Irish musician
 Len Kinsella (born 1946), Scottish footballer
 Lewis Kinsella (born 1994), English footballer
 Liam Kinsella, English-born Irish footballer
 Mark Kinsella (born 1972), Irish footballer
 Mike Kinsella (born 1977), American musician
 Nate Kinsella (born 1980), American musician
 Niels Kinsella, Irish musician, member of God Is an Astronaut
 Noël Kinsella (born 1939), Canadian senator
 Owen Kinsella, Irish football player
 Pat Kinsella, English footballer
 Ray Kinsella (1911–1996), Canadian ice hockey player
 Sophie Kinsella, English Novelist
 Stephan Kinsella (born 1965), American lawyer and author
 Ted Kinsella, CBE (1893–1967), Australian politician and judge
 Torsten Kinsella, Irish musician, member of God Is an Astronaut
 Thomas Kinsella (1928–2021), Irish poet
 Thomas Kinsella (politician) (1832–1884), American politician
 Tim Kinsella (born 1974), American musician
 Tommy Kinsella (1941–2009), Irish soccer player
 Tony Kinsella (born 1961), English footballer
 Warren Kinsella (born 1960), Canadian lawyer and author
 Walter Kinsella (disambiguation), several people
 W. P. Kinsella (1935–2016), Canadian author

Spelling variations
 Kinchella
 Kinchsular
 Kingslagh
 Kingslaghe
 Kinsela
 Kinshellagh
 Kinshlagh
 Kinslayer
 Kinsler
 Kynsellagh
 Kynsellaghe
 O'Kinsella
 O'Cinnseallaigh
 Kinsley

See also
 Kinsella Peak, a mountain peak in Antarctica
 Kinsella, Alberta, Canada, a hamlet
 Uí Ceinnselaig, an Irish dynasty of Leinster

References

External links
Ancient Kinsella Lineage at Kinsella.org
 How to pronounce Kinsella in Irish, forvo.com

Anglicised Irish-language surnames